Isobutyryl chloride (2-methylpropanoyl chloride) is the simplest branched-chain acyl chloride. It is found at room temperature as a corrosive, colorless liquid.

References

Acyl chlorides
Reagents for organic chemistry